The National Science and Technology Museum (NSTM) is a museum of applied science and technology in Sanmin District, Kaohsiung, Taiwan.

History
The museum was established in November 1997.

Architecture
The museum covers an area of 19 hectares on Chiuju Road in Sanmin District. The floor area covers 112,400 square meters and as a result claims to be the largest science museum in Asia. The architecture features geometric forms including triangles, rectangles, and circles, and the buildings are connected by straight bridges.

Transportation
The museum accessible via the Science and Technology Museum railway station of the Taiwan Railways.

See also
 List of museums in Taiwan

References

External links

 

1997 establishments in Taiwan
Museums established in 1997
Museums in Kaohsiung
Science and Technology Museum
Science museums in Taiwan
Technology museums